Edge Peak is a summit in the Golden Ears Group, located in Golden Ears Provincial Park north of Maple Ridge, British Columbia. The peak is not named for its shape but rather for Sam Edge who climbed it in 1876
. Other mountains in this area include Golden Ears and Blanshard Peak.

References

External links

Mountains of the Lower Mainland
Garibaldi Ranges
One-thousanders of British Columbia